Highline, High line, or Hi-Line may also refer to:

Parks
 High Line, a park along a former elevated freight rail spur in Manhattan, New York City, United States.
 Camden Highline, a proposed elevated park converted from an old railway in Camden Town, London, United Kingdom
 Highline Lake State Park, a Colorado state park
 Min Hi Line, a proposed linear park and shared-use path in Minneapolis, Minnesota, United States.

Transport

Rail
 The Highline, a segment of the Western Pacific Railroad in Northern California, linking Portola with Bieber
 Highline Bridge (Kansas City, Kansas), an elevated line from Armourdale to Union Station
 Hi-Line, the name of a subdivision of the Northern Transcon railway, often applied to the entire line
 Hi-Line (Montana), an area of northern Montana named for the railway
 Hi-Line Railroad Bridge, a historic bridge on the railway located over the Sheyenne River in North Dakota
 West Philadelphia Elevated, also known as the West Philadelphia High Line, a section of the Harrisburg Subdivision railroad line in Pennsylvania

Waterways
 High Line Canal, a waterway in the Denver-Aurora Metropolitan Area of Colorado

Schools
 Highline College, a community college in Des Moines, Washington
 Highline High School, a public high school in Burien, Washington

Media
 The Hi-Line, a 1999 film

Other
 High line, an overhead form of a picket line used to tie up horses
 HighLine, a development tool for the Ruby programming language
 Daihatsu Hi-Line, a series of trucks

See also
 Highliner, a railcar
 Highlining, a type of slacklining
 Viaduct, a multi-span elevated bridge
 Highline Trail (disambiguation), a number of higher-altitude or converted railroad highline trails